Orthocomotis ferruginea is a species of moth of the family Tortricidae. It is found in Ecuador in Napo and Loja provinces.

The wingspan is 26–28 mm. The ground colour of the forewings is white preserved in the subterminal area of the wing and along the edges of the markings. The median parts of the interfasciae are grey and orange rust and there are glossy green suffusions in the basal, subdorsal and postmedian areas. The hindwings are cream grey, suffused and strigulated (finely streaked) with grey.

Etymology
The species name refers to the orange rust elements of the wing pattern and is derived from Latin ferrugineus (meaning rust coloured).

References

Moths described in 2007
Orthocomotis